Miss Grand Ecuador 2021 was the inaugural edition of the Miss Grand Ecuador beauty pageant, held on June 26, 2021, at the TC Televisión Studios in Guayaquil. Six contestants, qualified for the national stage through an online audition, competed for the title, of whom the a 20-year old medical student and model from Los Ríos, Andrea Aguilera, was elected the winner. The contest was showcased under the direction of Tahiz Panus and Miguel Panus, presidents of the Concurso Nacional de Belleza Ecuador (CNB Ecuador), who have owned the Miss Grand Ecuador license since 2019.

The event was broadcast nationwide via TC Televisión as well as on Miss Grand International's YouTube channel, GrandTV, for a global audience. Clara Sosa, Miss Grand International 2018 from Paraguay, attended the event and served as the public speaking trainer for the delegates during the pageant camp held a few days before the gala final, which was hosted by Ronald Farina and Miguel Cedeño. The media expected the current international titleholder, American Abena Appiah, to attend, but the airline was unable to arrive for unknown reasons, according to the organization's publicist. 

Andrea temporarily quit her undergraduate studies after winning the competition to compete in the  pageant in Thailand, where she was named the vice-queen of the Vietnamese candidate, Nguyễn Thúc Thùy Tiên. Furthermore, the contest's first runner-up, Emilia Vásquez of Pichincha Province, was later assignated Miss Grand Ecuador 2022 and was expected to represent the country at the 2022 international contest in Indonesia, but she was replaced by Liseth Naranjo for undisclosed reasons.

Competition
In the grand final competition held on June 26, the results of the early round—which consisted of the swimsuit and evening gown competitions and the speech round, wherein all six qualified candidates delivered a speech related to the pageant campaign, Stop wars and violence—determined the 3 semifinalists, who then competed in the question and answer portion. After which, Miss Grand Ecuador 2021 and her two runners-up were announced.

The summary of the selection process is shown below.

Result

Contestants
6 contestants competed for the title of Miss Grand Ecuador 2021.

References

External links

 

Miss Grand Ecuador
Grand Ecuador